The 2006–07 season of the Philippine Basketball League (PBL).

2006-07 Silver Cup

Hapee-PCU vs Mail and More (Best-of-five semis)

Harbour vs Toyota-Otis (Best-of-five semis)

Silver Cup finals

The Port Masters leaned on the red-hot shooting of Jonathan Fernandez, who finished with 23 points as he fueled Harbour's two decisive breakaways - the last one in the final six minutes where he clustered two straight triples that finally took the fight out of the Teeth Masters, 69-51. Chico Lanete, the hero in Games 1 and 3, provided the needed firepower while Al Vergara created the plays for the team.

Silver Cup Awards
 Most Valuable Player: Jayson Castro (Hapee)
 Finals MVP: Chico Lanete (Harbour)
 Fantastic Freshman Award: Mark Borboran (Hapee)
 Heart of a Champion Award: Marvin Cruz (Toyota-Otis)
 Defensive Stopper Award: Elmer Espiritu (Mail & More)
 Quantum Leap Award: Patrick Cabahug (Toyota-Otis)
 Instant Impact Award: Bonbon Custodio (Magnolia)
 Mythical First Team
 Jayson Castro (Hapee)
 Marvin Cruz (Toyota-Otis)
 JR Quiñahan (Mail & More)
 Larry Rodriguez (Hapee)
 Dennis Daa (Toyota-Otis)
 Mythical Second Team
 Mark Borboran (Hapee)
 Patrick Cabahug (Toyota-Otis)
 Chico Lanete (Harbour)
 JC Intal (Harbour)
 Kelvin Gregorio (Henkel Sista)

2007 Unity Cup

Note: Ariel Vanguardia replaces Louie Alas as Toyota coach

Unity Cup Finals

After being held to a close game in the first three quarters, Jayson Castro and JC Intal combined to lead a fiery breakaway that saw Harbour took a 75-60 lead with 5:58 remaining. Castro and Chico Lanete, the series' finals MVP, each scored 18 points, while Ryan Araña and JC Intal chipped in 15 markers apiece.

Unity Cup Awards
 Most Valuable Player: Jayson Castro (Harbour) *The second player to win back-to-back MVP 
 Finals MVP: Chico Lanete (Harbour)
 Mythical First Team
 Jayson Castro (Harbour)
 Ken Bono (Cebuana-Lhuillier)
 Doug Kramer (Cebuana-Lhuillier)
 Chico Lanete (Harbour)
 Dennis Daa (Toyota-Balintawak)
 Mythical Second Team
 Ronjay Buenafe (Burger King)
 Macky Escalona (Cebuana-Lhuillier)
 Chad Alonzo (Harbour)
 Patrick Cabahug (Toyota-Balintawak)
 JR Quiñahan (Burger King)

References

External links
 PBL Official Website

Philippine Basketball League seasons
PBL